Charles E. Johnson may refer to:

Charles E. Johnson (FBI Most Wanted fugitive), American criminal
Charles E. Johnson (government official), American public official, acting Secretary of Health and Human Services from January 2009 to April 2009
Charles E. Johnson, early 1890s music/dance performer
Charles Elliott Johnson, Democratic member of the North Carolina General Assembly, 2003–2004
Charles Ellis Johnson (1857–1926), American photographer
Charles Johnson (wide receiver, born 1972) (Charles Everett Johnson), American football player
Charles Ellicott Johnson, interim President of the University of Oregon
Charles Eric Johnson, co-writer of The Monkey Hustle

See also
Charles Johnson (disambiguation)
Johnson (surname)